Back in Black is the third album by American hip hop group Whodini. It was recorded in London and released via Jive Records in 1986. Like on the group's previous work, audio production was handled by Larry Smith. The album peaked at #35 on the Billboard 200, #4 on the Top R&B/Hip-Hop Albums, and was certified gold by Recording Industry Association of America on June 23, 1986.

The record spawned three singles: "Funky Beat" (peaked at #19 on the Hot R&B/Hip-Hop Songs and #30 on the Dance Club Songs), "One Love" (peaked at #10 on the Hot R&B/Hip-Hop Songs and #34 on the Dance Club Songs), and "Growing Up" (peaked at #58 on the Hot R&B/Hip-Hop Songs).

The music video for "Funky Beat" featured appearances by Malcolm-Jamal Warner, who was a cast member of The Cosby Show at the time, as well as Floyd Vivino with his puppet Oogie from The Uncle Floyd Show. The music video for the third single "Growing Up" was notable by the appearances of actors Giancarlo Esposito, Laurence Fishburne and Carl Anthony Payne II.

Track listing

Note
Track 5 contains samples from "Piano Sonata, Op. 35, No. 2 in B-flat Minor" by Frédéric Chopin (1839)

Personnel
Jalil Hutchins - performer
John "Ecstacy" Fletcher - performer
Lawrence Smith - backing vocals, producer, bass, keyboard programming
Ron Gray - backing vocals (track 2)
Bryan Chuck New - mixing, engineer
Peter Brian Harris - fairlight programming
Jerry Peal - engineer
Peter Woolliscroft - engineer
George Young - solo guitar (track 6)
Paul Kodish - drums 
Barry Eastmond - keyboards (track 9)
Doug Rowell - photography

Charts

Weekly charts

Year-end charts

Certifications

References

External links

1986 albums
Whodini albums
Jive Records albums
Albums produced by Larry Smith (producer)